David Nakayama (born August 15, 1978 in Honolulu, Hawaii) is an American concept artist and comic book artist, currently working in the video game field and as cover artist

Career 
David Nakayama's first professional comics work was published in Star Wars Tales #17, while he was a student at The Kubert School.  After winning Wizard Magazine's "Be The Next Top Cow Superstar" contest, he left the school and became an art intern at Top Cow Productions in Los Angeles, CA.   Under the instruction of industry legend Marc Silvestri, David improved his craft and went on to pencil titles such as Witchblade and City of Heroes before moving on to Marvel Comics in 2007.  There, he helped launch the Marvel Adventures: Hulk series and later collaborated with Chris Claremont on a 5-issue Big Hero 6 miniseries for Marvel.

Nakayama has also produced art for the City of Heroes Collectible Card Game.

Selected bibliography

Video games
 War Commander (KIXEYE, October 2012)
 Battle Pirates (KIXEYE, October 2012)
 City of Heroes Freedom (Paragon Studios/NCSoft 2012)
 City of Heroes Going Rogue (Paragon Studios/NCSoft 2010)
 City of Heroes DLC—Issues 14-21 (Paragon Studios/NCSoft 2005-12)

Penciler
 "The Apprentice" in Star Wars Tales #17 (Dark Horse Comics, October 2003)
 Proximity Effect Graphic Novel (Top Cow, June 2004)
 Witchblade #77 (Top Cow, July 2004)
 City of Heroes #1-3, 5, 7-12, 16 (Top Cow, May 2005-November 2006)
 Revved Graphic Novel (Top Cow, February 2007)
 "Misunderstood" in Marvel Adventures: Iron Man and Hulk #1 (Marvel, May 2007)
 Marvel Adventures: Hulk #1,3-5,7,and 8 (Marvel, July 2007-February 2008)
 Marvel Adventures: Spider-man #38 and #40 (Marvel, April and June 2008)
 Marvel Adventures: Fantastic Four #35 (Marvel, April 2008)

Cover art
 Proximity Effect #1 (online edition) (Top Cow, June 2004)
 Revved #1 (Top Cow, August 2006)
 City of Heroes 15-20 (Top Cow, October 2006-March 2007)
 Marvel Adventures: Iron Man and Hulk #1 (Marvel, May 2007)
 Marvel Adventures: Hulk #4 (Marvel, October 2007)
 Marvel Adventures: Hulk Digest vol.1, 'Misunderstood Monster' (Marvel, November 2007)
 Sheena #5 (Devil's Due, February 2008)
 Marvel Adventures: Spider-Man #36 (Marvel, February 2008)
 Return to Wonderland #2--reprint edition (Zenescope, March 2008)
 Hack/Slash #10 (Devil's Due, March 2008)
 Marvel Adventures: Hulk Digest vol.2, 'Defenders' (Marvel, April 2008)
 Marvel Adventures: Spider-man Digest vol.2, 'Fiercest Foes' (Marvel, April 2008)
 Grimm Fairy Tales #26—New York Comic-con exclusive (Zenescope, April 2008)
 Grimm Fairy Tales #27 (Zenescope, May 2008)
 Marvel Adventures: Hulk #12 (Marvel, April 2008)
 Beyond Wonderland #0--Emerald City Comicon exclusive (Zenescope, May 2008)
 Sinbad #1--Wizardworld Philadelphia exclusive (Zenescope, May 2008)
 3001: A Laced Odyssey Hip Hop album by Flatbush Zombies (Electric KoolAde Records, March 2016)
 "Deadpool Annual" #2 (Marvel, 21 May 2014)

References

External links
 David Nakayama's Website
 David's DeviantArt Gallery
 David's Myspace profile
 AArisings A-Profiler Interview from San Diego Comic Con

Living people
1978 births
Punahou School alumni
Artists from Honolulu
American comics artists
Nakayama, Dave
American people of Japanese descent